Northern Storm may refer to:

Northern Storm (rugby league team), New Zealand rugby league team
Northern Storm Brigade, Syrian rebel group 
Operation Northern Storm, combat operation in 2013 Battle of Aleppo